A visor is a surface that protects the eyes.

Visor may also refer to:

 Visor (armor)
 VISOR, a fictional device in Star Trek media.
 ViSOR (Violent and Sex Offender Register), a UK database
 Bow visor, a feature of some ships, particularly ferries
 Visor, a PDA series made by Handspring
 The Visor, a rock ledge on the top of Half Dome in Yosemite National Park

See also

 
 
 Advisor
 Vizor, Irish software company